Pass the Jar - Zac Brown Band and Friends Live (From the Fabulous Fox Theatre In Atlanta) is the second live album by American country music band, Zac Brown Band. It was released on May 4, 2010. As of September 2015, the album has sold 526,000 copies in the US.

Content
Pass The Jar contains 2 CDs and 1 DVD of Zac Brown Band's live performance at the Fox Theatre in Atlanta, GA on October 30, 2009. Guest artists on the album include: Kid Rock, Little Big Town, Shawn Mullins, Joey + Rory, Angie Aparo, Sonia Leigh.

Critical reception
Steve Leggett with Allmusic gave the release a three-and-a-half out of five star rating, saying that it "captures the reverent, communal feel of the band’s performances [...] It all flows naturally and easily, making this set a wonderful introduction to a very special band."

Track listing

Charts

Weekly charts

Year-end charts

Certifications

References

Zac Brown Band albums
2010 live albums